(also known as the Jersey Language, Jersey French and Jersey Norman French in English) is a Romance language and the traditional language of the Jersey people. It is a form of the Norman language spoken in Jersey, an island in the Channel Islands archipelago off the coast of France.

Use of  has been in decline over the past century, as English has increasingly become the language of education, commerce and administration on Jersey. There are very few people who speak  as a mother tongue and, owing to the age of the remaining speakers, their numbers decrease annually. Despite this, efforts are being made to keep the language alive.

The language of Sark, Sercquiais, is a descendant of the  brought by the Jersey colonists who settled Sark in the 16th century, with mutual intelligibility with the Norman language of mainland Normandy.

For this reason, some prefer using the term "Jersey Norman" to avoid ambiguity and to dissociate the language from standard French.

History

Although few now speak  as a first language, until the 19th century,  was used as the everyday language for the majority of the population of Jersey; even as late as the beginning of the Second World War, up to half the population could still communicate in the language. Despite this, awareness of the decline of language use became apparent in the 19th century in scholarly circles. Among foreign linguists, Louis Lucien Bonaparte visited Jersey and interested himself in the language and its literature. Victor Hugo, during his exile in Jersey, took an interest in the language and numbered some  writers among his circle of acquaintances and supporters.

Sir Robert Pipon Marett's prestige and influence helped to reinforce the movement toward standardisation of the writing system based on French orthography, a trend which was also helped by the nascent Norman literary revival in the neighbouring Cotentin area of mainland Normandy where writers, inspired by the example of the Norman writers of Jersey and Guernsey, began their own production of literary works. However, differing (if mutually comprehensible) writing systems have been adopted in Jersey, Guernsey and mainland Normandy.

As English became dominant in Jersey in the 20th century, efforts were made to preserve the  language. The Jersey Eisteddfod has included a  section since 1912. Associations were founded;  was founded in 1951, while  is a trust set up in accordance with the will of Arthur E. Balleine (1864–1943), who bequeathed funds for the promotion of the language.  launched a quarterly magazine in 1952, which has been published since (with the occasional hiatus, and latterly under the editorship of ); a standard grammar  (by Paul Birt) appeared in 1985; cassettes, booklets and other materials have also been produced.

George d'la Forge's maintenance of the language in the North American diaspora is not as surprising as it might seem, as considerable numbers of Jersey people had been involved in the economic development and exploitation of the New World (see New Jersey). Much of the concentration focused on the cod fisheries of the Gaspé peninsula in Quebec, Canada, which were controlled into the early 20th century by Jersey-based companies or companies of Jersey origin employing Jersey labour. The Gaspesian expression  (to go and work outside the region) comes from the  word "run" applied to a fishing station.

However, the social and economic upheaval of the War meant that use of English increased dramatically after the Liberation.

It is considered that the last monolingual adult speakers probably died in the 1950s, although monolingual speaking children were being received into schools in St. Ouen as late as the late 1970s.

Famous  speakers include Lillie Langtry and Sir John Everett Millais, the Pre-Raphaelite painter.

Dictionaries

The history of  dictionaries goes back to 19th century manuscript glossaries work of Philippe Langlois, A. A. Le Gros and Thomas Gaudin. The 1960 Glossary of Jersey French (Nichol Spence) recorded  in phonetic script. The 1924  inspired the research by Frank Le Maistre that culminated in the  published in 1966 to mark the 900th anniversary of the Norman Conquest of England.

Status 

The latest figures come from the Jersey Annual Social Survey issued on 5 December 2012. The survey of 4200 households took place in June 2012 and resulted in 2400 returns.

These figures update those of the census (2001), which showed that approximately 3% of the island's population spoke  in their personal interactions, although research suggests that up to 15% of the population have some understanding of the language. The latest census figures also showed an increase in declarations of children speaking the language: the first such increase recorded in census figures (although this may be due to greater consciousness among parents than to language use), doubtless encouraged by the introduction of a  teaching programme into Jersey schools.

The parish with the highest proportion of  speakers (8%) is Saint Ouen, and the parish with the lowest proportion (2.1%) is Saint Helier, although Saint Helier as the largest parish has the highest number of  speakers. The number of census respondents who stated that they "usually" spoke  was 113; 2,761 respondents stated that they "sometimes" spoke . A survey carried out among a sample of  speakers in 1996 found that 18% spoke  more often than English, 66% spoke  as often as English, and 16% spoke  less often than English.

The States of Jersey fund the teaching programme in schools and provide some support in terms of signage, such as welcome signs at harbours and the airport. Ratification of the European Charter for Regional or Minority Languages is under discussion. In September 2005, the States approved the development of a cultural strategy, one of whose strategic objectives was as follows:

Jersey almost lost its language in the 20th century. In the 21st century strenuous efforts are being made to re-establish it. , funded by the States, is leading a programme in schools teaching .  promotes the language generally. Language brings distinctiveness, a sense of localness and a whole new set of skills all of which are important qualities in attracting the creative economy. It is fundamental to the Island's identity. This objective is to work with these organisations to help in the revival and status of the language.

 is recognised as a regional language by the British and Irish governments within the framework of the British–Irish Council. On 13 February 2019, the States of Jersey adopted  as an official language, and the language is set to be used on signage and official letter headings.

Literature

The tradition of literature in  can be traced back to Wace, a 12th century Jersey-born poet, although there is little surviving literature in  dating to before the introduction of the first printing press in Jersey in the 1780s. A boom in competing newspapers and journals throughout the 19th century provided a platform for poets and writers to publish regularly – typically, satirical comment on the week's news, elections, Jersey politicians and notables. The first printed anthology of  poetry, Rimes Jersiaises, was published in 1865.

Influential writers include "Laelius" (Sir Robert Pipon Marett 1820 – 1884, Bailiff of Jersey, 1880–1884), "A.A.L.G." (Augustus Aspley Le Gros, 1840–1877), and "St.-Luorenchais" (Philippe Langlois, 1817–1884). "Elie" (Edwin J. Luce, 1881–1918) was editor of the French language newspaper , and a poet who wrote topical poems for the newspaper.

During the Occupation, Nazi censors permitted little original writing to be published. However, many older pieces of literature were re-published in the newspapers as an act of cultural self-assertion and morale-boosting.

He emigrated to North America after the First World War, but for almost forty years maintained a flow of articles in  back to Jersey for publication in newspapers. Selections of his articles have been published in book form.

Frank Le Maistre (1910–2002), compiler of the dictionary , maintained a literary output starting in the 1930s with newspaper articles under the pseudonym , poems, magazine articles, research into toponymy and etymology.

Vocabulary
Although  is occasionally misleadingly described as a mixture of Norse and French, it is more linguistically accurate to describe the language as Norse adapted to langue d'oïl; when Norse-speaking Normans (lit. "North-man") conquered the territory now known as Normandy, they began speaking the language of their new subjects, leading to its influence on the language. The Norman language is therefore in essence a Romance language with a certain amount of vocabulary of Norse origin, with the inclusion of later loanwords from other languages.

Influence of Norse
Norse origins can be seen in  words such as these:
 ("sand dune")
 ("mug")
 ("yard")
 ("blackcurrant")
 ("seagull")
 ("to prepare")
 ("cart")
 ("bait")
 ("to doze")

Influence of Breton
 has also adopted a small number of words from the Breton language (e.g.  'spider crab', from Breton  'small';  'fast', from Breton  'hare'), although the influence on today's language has overwhelmingly been from French and, increasingly, English.

Influence of French

A large number of gallicisms have been introduced into the language due to the use of French as an official language and the cultural influence of France and French literature. Some French words have displaced in modern usage Jèrriais words that can still be found in older texts from the 18th and 19th centuries, for example:
French  (in the form ) has displaced native  (lesson)
French  has displaced native  (boy)
French  has displaced native  (song)

Efforts are being made to maintain some Jèrriais words which are competing in usage with French forms, for example:
native  is being promoted over French  (oil)
native  (eighty) is being promoted over French  (fourscore)

Influence of English
Some maritime vocabulary was borrowed from English at an early date, for example  (boatswain), but by the late 18th century some domestic vocabulary, such as:
  (to polish shoes, from blacking)
  (to cook)
  (gravy)
  (to rub in soapy water, from washing)
  (scrubbing brush)
  (saucepan)
  (skillet)
  (from tea-kettle)
  (phone code)
entered the language through the employment of Jèrriais-speaking servants in the houses of bourgeois English-speaking immigrants.

Other words borrowed from English before 1900 include:
  (to share)
  (underpants, from drawers)
  (to worry)
  (cotton wool, from wadding)
  (nurse)
  (to throw, from swing)
  (to stand, to endure)
 

Phonology 

 may also be heard as an approximant sound .

The phonological influence of Norse is debated, although the aspirated "h" may be due to Norse influence.

Palatalisation
The palatalisation of Latin  and  before  that occurred in the development of French did not occur in northern dialects of Norman, including Jèrriais:

However the palatalisation of  before front vowel produced different results in the Norman dialect that developed into Jèrriais than in French. (Many developments are similar to those in Italian, cf. -hundred and -face).

At a later date surviving  and  underwent a secondary process of palatalisation:

This palatalisation continues to operate (except in initial position) as can be seen by recent borrowings from English:

Dental fricative
A feature of Jèrriais that is immediately noticeable and distinguishes it from neighbouring languages is the voiced dental fricative , written th, that typically occurs in intervocalic position:

Or in final position:

The fricative developed from  + front vowel, but evidently after the 16th century as this feature is unknown in the language of Sark (colonised by Jersey families). Although the voiced dental fricative is standard in the literary language, it is not found in the eastern dialects.

This may be represented in the orthography of particular writers.

The dental fricative in the dialect of such speakers may also be heard in liaison:

Length
Length is phonemic in Jèrriais. Long vowels are usually indicated in writing by a circumflex accent. A noun ending in a vowel lengthens the final vowel to indicate the plural (shown in writing by adding an s).

Gemination occurs regularly in verb tenses, indicated by a consonant-apostrophe-consonant trigraph, for example:  (she will speak);  (we will begin);  (he would give). Gerunds will also regularly contain geminate consonants, for example:  (doing, making);  (singing);  (shooting);  (sweeping);  (winning).

Orthography

Grammar

Verbs

Aspect
Jèrriais distinguishes between simple, progressive and perfect aspect:

Past:

Future:

Present:

Iterative

Gerunds

Verbs can be transformed into gerunds, which are commonly used:

Examples

See also

Auregnais
Culture of Jersey
Sercquiais

Notes

References

Literature
 Lé Jèrriais Pour Tous by Paul W. Birt, 1985.
 Dictionnaire Jersiais–Français, 1966.
 A Grammar of the Norman French of the Channel Islands: The Dialects of Jersey and Sark by Anthony J. Liddicoat, 1994. 
 Jersey Norman French: A Linguistic Study of An Obsolescent Dialect . Mari C. Jones, 2001
 Jèrriais: Jersey's Native Tongue by Mari C. Jones, 2003. 
 Dictionnaithe Jèrriais-Angliais. 2005. 
 Les Chroniques du Don Balleine/Les Nouvelles Chroniques du Don Balleine (magazine). Jersey 1979 – current.

External links

L'Office du Jèrriais
La Société Jersiaise – La Section de la langue Jèrriaise
La Société Jersiaise – Les Pages Jèrriaises
BBC Radio Jersey – Jèrriais
The Lord's prayer in Jèrriais
Jèrriais and Sercquiais today by Dr Mari C. Jones – from the BBC

Jersey culture

Languages of the Channel Islands
Norman language
Endangered Romance languages